The Fairleigh Dickinson Knights refer to the 17 intercollegiate sports teams representing Fairleigh Dickinson University's Metropolitan campus in Teaneck & Hackensack, New Jersey. Fairleigh Dickinson University or (FDU) offers a variety of sports on the Division I level. The women's bowling team has won two national titles: in 2006 and 2010. The men's basketball team has reached the NCAA Tournament seven times in the history of the program (1985, 1988, 1998, 2005, 2016, 2019, and 2023). The Knights compete in the NCAA Division I and are members of the Northeast Conference.

In 2023 men's basketball created one of the biggest upsets in the history of the NCAA tournament by overcoming a 23.5 point spread to knock off Purdue. In doing so, The Knights became only the second #16 seed to beat a #1 seed in tournament history.

Sports sponsored 

A member of the Northeast Conference,  Fairleigh Dickinson sponsors teams in nine men's and eleven women's NCAA sanctioned sports:

Soccer

Seth Roland has been coach of the soccer team for over a quarter of a century, and was named 2000 Northeast Conference Men's Soccer Coach of the Year. As of 2022, he was the winningest coach in FDU men's soccer history (223-186-65, .538), the winningest coach in Northeast Conference history (115-60-37, .626), and the ninth active-winningest-coach in NCAA Division I.

Jacob Lissek holds the Knights’ all-time career record for shutouts (26).

Notes

References

External links
 

 
Sports teams in the New York metropolitan area